Harlot is a 1964 American underground film directed by Andy Warhol, written by Ronald Tavel, and featuring Mario Montez lounging on a sofa, eating bananas, with Gerard Malanga in a tuxedo, and with Tavel, Billy Name, and Harry Fainlight having an off-screen discussion. This was Warhol's first sync-sound movie, filmed in December 1964 with his new Auricon camera.

See also
List of American films of 1964
Andy Warhol filmography

References

External links
Harlot at IMDB
Harlot at WarholStars

1964 films
Films directed by Andy Warhol
1964 comedy films
1960s English-language films
1960s American films